Starvation Heights is an unincorporated community in Jackson County, in the U.S. state of Oregon. It lies along East Evans Creek Road off Interstate 5 and Oregon Route 99.

It was named before 1883 for its poor and infertile soil, a granite-like mix which supported only scrub vegetation.  The neighboring rise is slightly lower in elevation, but had rich soil.  Failed farmers were said to be "starved out" when they moved on.

References 

Unincorporated communities in Jackson County, Oregon
Unincorporated communities in Oregon